The KTX-Eum (formerly known as EMU-260) or Korail Class 150000 is a South Korean high-speed electric multiple unit train manufactured by Hyundai Rotem and operated by Korail. The word 'eum' in Korean means 'uniting through connection'. This name was selected by members of the public, and expresses the desire to connect regions, people, and happiness through trains.

History

After the development of the prototype HEMU-430X train, Hyundai-Rotem and Korail signed an agreement in June 2016 to supply high-speed electric multiple units, the first of its kind in South Korea in commercial service (the HEMU-430X is also an electric multiple unit, but it is not for service and mass production). The original order was for five six-car units, but an additional order for 14 six-car units was placed in December 2016; both orders were scheduled for delivery from 2020 to 2021.

In September 2016, Korail held a public contest for the design of the new models. In 2017, a mockup of the chosen design was exhibited to the public to promote the train and receive feedback. On November 4, 2019, the first set was delivered to Korail.

In August 2020, Korail held a public competition for the name of the new model, which at the time was known as the EMU-260. The model was officially renamed "KTX-Eum" (KTX-이음) in October 2020, after Korail filed patent trademark with the Korean Intellectual Property Office.

On January 4, 2021, the train entered service on Jungang Line operating between the electrified section of Cheongnyangni and Andong.

On July 13, 2021, Korail announced the train will be introduced on Gangneung Line from August 1, replacing KTX-Sancheon which would be redeployed to other KTX lines.

Design

Technology incorporated in these trains is derived from the experimental HEMU-430X train previously tested by Korail. The KTX-Eum will feature the same design as EMU-320 trains, but the formation will consist of six cars as opposed to eight cars. Unlike KTX trains, the KTX-Eum uses distributed traction with driving trailers at each end and six powered intermediate cars as opposed to a traction head configuration.

Interior

Unlike KTX trains, the seats on KTX-Eum feature more leg room, wider armrests, USB ports, wireless charging pads, and entertainment displays similar to inflight entertainment systems found on aircraft. In addition, every seat is aligned with the window.

Fleet List

, the fleet is as follows:

See also

 List of high speed trains
 HEMU-430X
 EMU-320
 Rail transport in South Korea

References

High-speed trains of South Korea
Rolling stock of South Korea
Train-related introductions in 2021
Electric multiple units of South Korea
Hyundai Rotem multiple units
25 kV AC multiple units
Passenger trains running at least at 250 km/h in commercial operations